Jessica Malagón Moreno (born 6 July 1977 in Barcelona) is a goalball player from Spain.  She is blind and is a type B2 goalball player. She played goalball at the 1996 Summer Paralympics. Her team was third. She played goalball at the 2000 Summer Paralympics.  Her team was second.

References

External links 
 
 

Living people
1977 births
Paralympic bronze medalists for Spain
Paralympic silver medalists for Spain
Sportspeople from Barcelona
Goalball players at the 1996 Summer Paralympics
Goalball players at the 2000 Summer Paralympics
Paralympic goalball players of Spain
Paralympic medalists in goalball
Medalists at the 1996 Summer Paralympics
Medalists at the 2000 Summer Paralympics